Lloyd Tyrell-Kenyon, 5th Baron Kenyon,  (13 September 1917 - 16 May 1993), was a British hereditary peer, member of the House of Lords, and academic administrator. The only son of Lloyd Tyrell-Kenyon, 4th Baron Kenyon, he succeeded to the title of Baron Kenyon on his father's death in 1927.

Life
Lord Kenyon was educated at Eton and then Magdalene College, Cambridge. As a peer he was active across many fields of public life including education, museums and health.

Lord Kenyon was president of the University College of North Wales in Bangor (part of the University of Wales), from 1947 to 1982. Through the university he was behind the revival of the Gwasg Gregynog Press, which printed traditional hand-bound books from metal type and woodcuts illustrations, and he was chairman of the press from 1978 to 1991.

He was president of the National Museum of Wales from 1952 to 1957, trustee of the National Portrait Gallery from 1953 to 1988 and member of the Royal Commission on Historical Manuscripts from 1966 to 1993. He was credited with growing the NPG from a small specialist museum to "one of the great national galleries".

He was chairman of the Wrexham, Powys and Mawddach Hospital Management Committee from 1960 to 1974, and then chairman of the Clwyd Area Health Authority, 1974–1978.
As Flintshire county councillor he was appointed to their first records committee and was an active supporter of Flintshire Record Office (later Clwyd Record Office). He was also elected to North Wales Police Authority.

He was a director of Lloyds Bank.

He was a Justice of the Peace in 1944. He was made a Deputy Lieutenant for Flintshire in 1948, an Officer of the Most Venerable Order of the Hospital of St. John of Jerusalem and a Commander of the Order of the British Empire in 1972. He was a provincial grandmaster for the Freemasons of North Wales.
He married Leila Cookson in 1946 and three children - two sons, one of whom pre-deceased him and one daughter. He died in Gredington, Shropshire, on 16 May 1993, aged 75.

References

External links 

 Kenyon records, Flintshire Record Office
 Portraits at the National Portrait Gallery

1917 births
1993 deaths
People educated at Eton College
Alumni of Magdalene College, Cambridge
Deputy Lieutenants of Flintshire
Commanders of the Order of the British Empire
Lloyd 5